Theo Verschueren (born 27 January 1943) is a retired Belgian cyclist. He had his best achievements in motor-paced racing, in which he won the world championships in the professionals category in 1971 and 1972 and finished second in 1969, 1970 and 1974. During his career Verschueren took part in 67 six-day road races, winning the race of Antwerp in 1968 and 1972.

He married the daughter of Belgian cyclist Petrus Van Theemsche. He is not related to Adolph Verschueren, another motor-paced racing world champion from Belgium.

Major results

Track 

1965
Belgian National Championships 
1st  Derny
1st  Madison (with Robert Lelangue)
2nd  European Track Championships – Derny
2nd Six Days of Charleroi (with Norbert Seeuws)
3rd Six Days of Antwerp (with Patrick Sercu & Emile Severeyns)
1966
2nd  :Belgian National Championships - Madison(with Gilbert Maes)
1967
3rd  :Belgian National Championships - Motor-paced
1968
1st  European Track Championships – Derny
 Belgian National Championships 
1st  - Derny
2nd - Motor-paced
3rd - Omnium
1st Six Days of Antwerp (with Sigi Renz & Emile Severeyns)
1969
2nd  UCI Track World Championships - Motor paced 
2nd  European Track Championships – Derny
Belgian National Championships 
1st  Derny
1st  Motor-paced racing
3rd Six Days of Antwerp (with Sigi Renz & Emile Severeyns)
1970
2nd  UCI Track World Championships - Motor paced 
2nd  European Track Championships – Derny
Belgian National Championships 
1st  Derny
1st  Motor-paced racing
3rd Six Days of Antwerp (with Sigi Renz & Rik Van Looy)
1971
1st   UCI Track World Championships - Motor paced 
1st  European Track Championships – Derny
Belgian National Championships 
1st  Derny
1st  Motor-paced racing
3rd  Madison
3rd Six Days of Antwerp (with Sigi Renz & Walter Godefroot)
3rd Six Days of Ghent (with Julien Stevens)
1972
1st   UCI Track World Championships - Motor paced 
1st  European Track Championships – Derny
1st Six Days of Antwerp (with René Pijnen & Leo Duyndam)
2nd  European Track Championships - Motor-paced racing
2nd  Belgian National Championships - Madison
2nd Six Days of Groningen (with Graeme Gilmore)
1973
1st  European Track Championships – Derny
2nd  European Track Championships - Motor-paced racing
Belgian National Championships 
1st  Derny
1st  Motor-paced racing
3rd Six Days of Antwerp (with Norbert Seeuws & Walter Godefroot)
3rd Six Days of Ghent (with Cees Stam)
1974
1st  European Track Championships – Derny
2nd  UCI Track World Championships - Motor paced
2nd  Belgian National Championships - Motor-paced

Road 

1962
1st Coupe Marcel Indekeu
1963
1st Tour of Belgium amateurs
1st Ronde van Vlaanderen Amateurs
2nd Tour of Belgium indepentent
3rd  Belgian National Championships Amateurs 
1964
1st Antwerpse Havenpijl
1st Grand Prix d'Orchies
2nd GP Flandria
1965
1st Stage 6 (TTT) Four Days of Dunkirk
1966
1st Stage 1 (TTT) Tour de Romandie
1st Omloop van de Westkust
2nd GP Dr. Eugeen Roggeman
1967
2nd Omloop van Midden-Vlaanderen
3rd De Pinte
1968
1st GP Stad Sint-Niklaas
1972
1st Belsele-Puivelde

References

1943 births
Living people
Belgian male cyclists
People from Hulst
UCI Track Cycling World Champions (men)
Belgian track cyclists
Cyclists from Zeeland